Josip is a male given name found among Croats and Slovenes, a cognate of Joseph.

In Croatia, the name Josip was the second most common masculine given name in the decades up to 1959, and has stayed among the top ten most common ones throughout 2011.

Notable people named Josip include:

 Ruđer Josip Bošković, Croatian physicist
 Josip Bozanić, Croatian cardinal
 Josip Broz Tito, Yugoslav president
 Josip Frank, Croatian politician
 Josip Globevnik, Slovenian mathematician
 Josip Golubar, Croatian footballer
 Josip Hatze, Croatian composer
 Josip Jelačić, Croatian ban
 Josip Katalinski, Bosnian footballer
 Josip Kozarac, Croatian writer
 Josip Manolić, Croatian politician
 Josip Marohnić, Croatian emigrant activist
 Josip Plemelj, Slovenian mathematician
 Josip Račić, Croatian painter
 Josip Skoblar, Croatian former player and football manager
 Josip Skoko, Australian soccer player
 Josip Juraj Strossmayer, Croatian bishop and politician
 Josip Šimunić, Croatian footballer
 Josip Štolcer-Slavenski, Croatian composer
 Josip Vranković, Croatian basketball coach

See also
 Josif
 Josef (given name)
 Josipović

References

Slovene masculine given names
Croatian masculine given names